The Aston Martin DBR5 (also known as DBR5/250) was a Formula One racing car, designed by the sports car manufacturer Aston Martin. Following the poor results of the Aston Martin DBR4 in the 1959 Formula One season the lighter and smaller DBR5 was intended to be quicker than its predecessor. However following poor results in 1960, Aston Martin decided to withdraw from Formula One.

Design
The Aston Martin DBR5 was largely based on the  car, the Aston Martin DBR4. It used the same basic chassis and engine layout. Improvements to the DBR5 made it smaller and lighter, and engine modifications meant that the power output was finally close to the figure originally claimed by the Aston Martin workshop. The DBR5 also boasted all-independent suspension.

But when that car also failed to provide competitive results against the strengthening rear mounted engined cars, Aston Martin abandoned Formula One to concentrate on their more successful sports car projects.

Two DBR5s were constructed in early 1960, but both were scrapped in 1961 following Aston Martin's withdrawal from Formula One.

Complete Formula One World Championship results
(key)

External links
Aston Martin DBR5. AstonMartins.com.

DBR5